Robert Dingley (c. 1377 – 2 April 1456), of Wolverton, Hampshire, was an English politician.

He was a Member (MP) of the Parliament of England for Hampshire in May 1421.

References

1377 births
1456 deaths
English MPs May 1421
People from Basingstoke and Deane